This is a list of 396 species in Rhagovelia, a genus of smaller water striders in the family Veliidae.

Rhagovelia species

 Rhagovelia abalienata Hoberlandt, 1951 i c g
 Rhagovelia aberrans Andersen, 1965 i c g
 Rhagovelia abra Nieser, Zettel and Chen, 1997 i c g
 Rhagovelia abrupta Gould, 1934 i c g
 Rhagovelia acapulcana Drake, 1953 i c g
 Rhagovelia accedens Drake, 1957 i c g
 Rhagovelia achna Nieser, Zettel and Chen, 1997 i c g
 Rhagovelia acuminata Bacon, 1956 i c g
 Rhagovelia adrienneaebrasili Poisson, 1945 i c g
 Rhagovelia aeneipes Haglund, 1895 i c g
 Rhagovelia aestiva J. Polhemus, 1980 i c g
 Rhagovelia agilis J. Polhemus, 1976 i c g
 Rhagovelia agra Drake, 1957 i c g
 Rhagovelia aguaclara Padilla-Gil, 2010 i c g
 Rhagovelia ainsliei Drake and Harris, 1933 i c g
 Rhagovelia aiuruoca Moreira and Ribeiro, 2009 i c g
 Rhagovelia akrita J. Polhemus in J. Polhemus and Reisen, 1976 i c g
 Rhagovelia amazonensis Gould, 1931 i c g
 Rhagovelia ambonensis Lundblad, 1936 i c g
 Rhagovelia ambra D. Polhemus and Andersen, 2015 i c g
 Rhagovelia amnica Lansbury, 1993 i c g
 Rhagovelia andaman J. Polhemus, 1990 i c g
 Rhagovelia anderseni D. Polhemus, 1997 i c g
 Rhagovelia andringitrae D. Polhemus and Andersen, 2015 i c g
 Rhagovelia angulata D. Polhemus and Andersen, 2010 i c g
 Rhagovelia angustipes Uhler, 1894 i c g
 Rhagovelia antilleana D. Polhemus, 1997 i c g
 Rhagovelia antioquiae D. Polhemus, 1997 i c g
 Rhagovelia aquacola D. Polhemus and Andersen, 2015 i c g
 Rhagovelia arcuata (J. Polhemus and Manzano, 1992) i c g
 Rhagovelia armata (Burmeister, 1835) i c g
 Rhagovelia atrispina J. Polhemus, 1977 i c g
 Rhagovelia aureospicata Lansbury, 1993 i c g
 Rhagovelia australica Kirkaldy, 1908 i c g
 Rhagovelia azulita Padilla-Gil, 2009 i c g
 Rhagovelia bacanensis J. Polhemus and D. Polhemus, 1988 i c g
 Rhagovelia baconi D. Polhemus, 1997 i c g
 Rhagovelia bakeri Bergroth, 1914 i c g
 Rhagovelia barbacoensis  g
 Rhagovelia batantana D. Polhemus and J. Polhemus, 2011 i c g
 Rhagovelia beangonyi Poisson, 1952 i c g
 Rhagovelia becki Drake and Harris, 1936 i c g
 Rhagovelia bicolana Zettel, 2014 i c g
 Rhagovelia bipennicillata Lundblad, 1936 i c g
 Rhagovelia biroi Lundblad, 1936 i c g
 Rhagovelia bisignata Bacon, 1948 i c g
 Rhagovelia blogiokommena Nieser and Chen, 1993 i c g
 Rhagovelia bocaina Moreira and Ribeiro, 2009 i c g
 Rhagovelia boliviana D. Polhemus, 1997 i c g
 Rhagovelia borneensis J. Polhemus and D. Polhemus, 1988 i c g
 Rhagovelia brincki D. Polhemus and Andersen, 2015 i c g
 Rhagovelia browni Lansbury, 1993 i c g
 Rhagovelia brunae Magalhães and Moreira in Magalhães et al., 2016 i c g
 Rhagovelia brunipes Zettel, 2006 i c g
 Rhagovelia buesaquensis Padilla-Gil, 2009 i c g
 Rhagovelia cachipai Padilla-Gil, 2011 i c g
 Rhagovelia caesia Lansbury, 1993 i c g
 Rhagovelia calcarea D. Polhemus and J. Polhemus, 2011 i c g
 Rhagovelia calcaris Drake and Harris, 1935 i c g
 Rhagovelia calceola Padilla-Gil, 2011 i c g
 Rhagovelia cali D. Polhemus, 1997 i c g
 Rhagovelia callida Drake and Harris, 1935 i c g
 Rhagovelia calopa Drake and Harris, 1927 i c g
 Rhagovelia camiguinana Zettel, 1996 i c g
 Rhagovelia canlaonensis Zettel, 1996 i c g
 Rhagovelia cardia Padilla-Gil, 2011 i c g
 Rhagovelia caribbeana D. Polhemus, 1997 i c g
 Rhagovelia carina  g
 Rhagovelia castanea Gould, 1931 i c g
 Rhagovelia catemaco D. Polhemus, 1997 i c g
 Rhagovelia cauca D. Polhemus, 1997 i c g
 Rhagovelia caunapi  g
 Rhagovelia celebensis J. Polhemus and D. Polhemus, 1988 i c g
 Rhagovelia cenizae Zettel, 2007 i c g
 Rhagovelia cephala Padilla-Gil, 2009 i c g
 Rhagovelia ceylanica Lundblad, 1936 i c g
 Rhagovelia chac D. Polhemus and Chordas, 2010 i c g
 Rhagovelia chiapensis J. Polhemus, 1980 i c g
 Rhagovelia chiriqui D. Polhemus, 1997 i c g
 Rhagovelia choreutes Hussey, 1925 i c g b
 Rhagovelia christenseni J. Polhemus and D. Polhemus, 1988 i c g
 Rhagovelia chrysomalla Nieser and Chen, 1993 i c g
 Rhagovelia cimarrona Padilla-Gil, 2011 i c g
 Rhagovelia citata Drake, 1953 i c g
 Rhagovelia collaris (Burmeister, 1835) i c g
 Rhagovelia colombiana (J. Polhemus and Manzano, 1992) i c g
 Rhagovelia compacta D. Polhemus and Andersen, 2010 i c g
 Rhagovelia cotabatoensis Hungerford and Matsuda, 1961 i c g
 Rhagovelia crassipes Champion, 1898 i c g
 Rhagovelia crinita Lansbury, 1993 i c g
 Rhagovelia cubana D. Polhemus, 1997 i c g
 Rhagovelia culebrana Drake and Maldonado-Capriles, 1952 i c g
 Rhagovelia cuspidis Drake and Harris, 1933 i c g
 Rhagovelia cylindros Nieser, Zettel and Chen, 1997 i c g
 Rhagovelia daktylophora Nieser and Chen, 1993 i c g
 Rhagovelia danpolhemi Moreira, Pacheco-Chaves and Cordeiro in Moreira et al., 2015 i c g
 Rhagovelia deigmena Padilla-Gil, 2009 i c g
 Rhagovelia deminuta Bacon, 1948 i c g
 Rhagovelia diabolica Poisson, 1951 i c g
 Rhagovelia dilatissima Sallier Dupin, 1976 i c g
 Rhagovelia distincta Champion, 1898 i c g b
 Rhagovelia divisoensis Padilla-Gil, 2012 i c g
 Rhagovelia dostali Zettel, 2009 i c g
 Rhagovelia doveri Lundblad, 1933 i c g
 Rhagovelia drakei D. Polhemus, 1997 i c g
 Rhagovelia elegans Uhler, 1894 i c g
 Rhagovelia enckelli D. Polhemus and Andersen, 2015 i c g
 Rhagovelia ephydros (Drake and Van Doesburg, 1966) i c g
 Rhagovelia equatoria D. Polhemus, 1997 i c g
 Rhagovelia esakii Lundblad, 1937 i c g
 Rhagovelia espriella Padilla-Gil, 2011 i c g
 Rhagovelia estrella Zettel, 1994 i c g
 Rhagovelia evidis Bacon, 1948 i c g
 Rhagovelia faratsihoi D. Polhemus and Andersen, 2015 i c g
 Rhagovelia femoralis Champion, 1898 i c g
 Rhagovelia femorata Dover, 1928 i c g
 Rhagovelia festae Kirkaldy, 1899 i c g
 Rhagovelia fischeri Zettel, 1999 i c g
 Rhagovelia fontanalis Bacon, 1948 i c g
 Rhagovelia formosa Bacon, 1956 i c g
 Rhagovelia froeschneri D. Polhemus, 1997 i c g
 Rhagovelia fulva Lansbury, 1993 i c g
 Rhagovelia gaigei Drake and Hussey, 1957 i c g
 Rhagovelia gastrotricha Padilla-Gil, 2011 i c g
 Rhagovelia gorgona Manzano, Nieser and Caicedo, 1995 i c g
 Rhagovelia graindli Zettel, 2012 i c g
 Rhagovelia grandis Padilla-Gil, 2011 i c g
 Rhagovelia grayi J. Polhemus and D. Polhemus, 1988 i c g
 Rhagovelia gregalis Drake and Harris, 1927 i c g
 Rhagovelia guentheri Zettel, 2007 i c g
 Rhagovelia guianana D. Polhemus, 1997 i c g
 Rhagovelia gyrista Nieser, Zettel and Chen, 1997 i c g
 Rhagovelia hambletoni Drake and Harris, 1933 i c g
 Rhagovelia hamdjahi J. Polhemus and D. Polhemus, 1988 i c g
 Rhagovelia heissi Zettel and Bongo, 2006 i c g
 Rhagovelia henryi D. Polhemus, 1997 i c g
 Rhagovelia herzogensis Lansbury, 1993 i c g
 Rhagovelia hirsuta Lansbury, 1993 i c g
 Rhagovelia hirtipes Drake and Harris, 1927 i c g
 Rhagovelia hirtipoides D. Polhemus, 1997 i c g
 Rhagovelia hoogstraali Hungerford and Matsuda, 1961 i c g
 Rhagovelia horaia Nieser and Chen, 1993 i c g
 Rhagovelia hovana Hoberlandt, 1941 i c g
 Rhagovelia huila Padilla-Gil, 2009 i c g
 Rhagovelia humboldti D. Polhemus, 1997 i c g
 Rhagovelia hutchinsoni Lundblad, 1933 i c g
 Rhagovelia hynesi Poisson, 1949 i c g
 Rhagovelia ignota Drake and Harris, 1933 i c g
 Rhagovelia imitatrix Bacon, 1948 i c g
 Rhagovelia impensa Bacon, 1956 i c g
 Rhagovelia imperatrix Padilla-Gil, 2011 i c g
 Rhagovelia incognita J. Polhemus and D. Polhemus, 1988 i c g
 Rhagovelia inexpectata Zettel, 2000 i c g
 Rhagovelia infernalis (Butler, 1876) i c g
 Rhagovelia ingleae Zettel, 2012 i c g
 Rhagovelia itatiaiana Drake, 1953 i c g
 Rhagovelia itremoi Poisson, 1952 i c g
 Rhagovelia jagua  g
 Rhagovelia jaliscoana D. Polhemus, 1997 i c g
 Rhagovelia janeira Drake, 1953 i c g
 Rhagovelia johnpolhemi D. Polhemus, 1997 i c g
 Rhagovelia jubata Bacon, 1948 i c g
 Rhagovelia kalami Nieser and Chen, 1993 i c g
 Rhagovelia kararao Burguez Floriano and Moreira, 2015 i c g
 Rhagovelia karunaratnei J. Polhemus, 1979 i c g
 Rhagovelia kastanoparuphe Nieser and Chen, 1993 i c g
 Rhagovelia kawakamii (Matsumura, 1913) i c g
 Rhagovelia knighti Drake and Harris, 1927 i c g
 Rhagovelia krama Nieser, Zettel and Chen, 1997 i c g
 Rhagovelia lansburyi Zettel, 1995 i c g
 Rhagovelia leyteensis Zettel, 1996 i c g
 Rhagovelia linnavuorii Sallier Dupin, 1979 i c g
 Rhagovelia longipes Gould, 1931 i c g
 Rhagovelia lorelinduana J. Polhemus and D. Polhemus, 1988 i c g
 Rhagovelia lucida Gould, 1931 i c g
 Rhagovelia lugubris Lundblad, 1933 i c g
 Rhagovelia lundbladi Hungerford and Matsuda, 1961 i c g
 Rhagovelia luzonica Lundblad, 1937 i c g
 Rhagovelia macarena D. Polhemus, 1997 i c g
 Rhagovelia macta Drake and Carvalho, 1955 i c g
 Rhagovelia maculata Distant, 1903 i c g
 Rhagovelia madagascariensis Hoberlandt, 1941 i c g
 Rhagovelia madari Hoberlandt, 1941 i c g
 Rhagovelia madecassa D. Polhemus and Andersen, 2010 i c g
 Rhagovelia magdalena Padilla-Gil, 2011 i c g
 Rhagovelia malkini D. Polhemus, 1997 i c g
 Rhagovelia manamboloi Poisson, 1952 i c g
 Rhagovelia manankazo D. Polhemus and Andersen, 2010 i c g
 Rhagovelia mancinii Poisson, 1955 i c g
 Rhagovelia mandraka D. Polhemus and Andersen, 2015 i c g
 Rhagovelia manga D. Polhemus and Andersen, 2015 i c g
 Rhagovelia mangaratiba Moreira, Barbosa and Ribeiro, 2012 i c g
 Rhagovelia mangle Moreira, Nessimian and Rúdio in Moreira et al., 2010 i c g
 Rhagovelia manzanoi D. Polhemus, 1997 i c g
 Rhagovelia marinduquensis Zettel, 2012 i c g
 Rhagovelia maya D. Polhemus, 1997 i c g
 Rhagovelia meikdelyi J. Polhemus and D. Polhemus, 1988 i c g
 Rhagovelia melanopsis J. Polhemus and D. Polhemus, 1988 i c g
 Rhagovelia merga Bacon, 1956 i c g
 Rhagovelia milloti Poisson, 1948 i c g
 Rhagovelia minahasa J. Polhemus and D. Polhemus, 1988 i c g
 Rhagovelia mindanaoensis Hungerford and Matsuda, 1961 i c g
 Rhagovelia mindoroensis Zettel, 1994 i c g
 Rhagovelia minuta Lundblad, 1936 i c g
 Rhagovelia minutissima Hungerford and Matsuda, 1961 i c g
 Rhagovelia mira Drake and Harris, 1938 i c g
 Rhagovelia misoolana D. Polhemus and J. Polhemus, 2011 i c g
 Rhagovelia mixteca D. Polhemus, 1997 i c g
 Rhagovelia mocoa  g
 Rhagovelia modesta Bacon, 1956 i c g
 Rhagovelia mohelii Poisson, 1959 i c g
 Rhagovelia mondena D. Polhemus and Andersen, 2015 i c g
 Rhagovelia narinensis Padilla-Gil, 2011 i c g
 Rhagovelia negrosensis Zettel, 1995 i c g
 Rhagovelia nicolai Padilla-Gil, 2011 i c g
 Rhagovelia nieseri Zettel, 1995 i c g
 Rhagovelia nigra Hungerford, 1933 i c g
 Rhagovelia nigranota D. Polhemus and Chordas, 2003 i c g
 Rhagovelia nigricans (Burmeister, 1835) i c g
 Rhagovelia nilgiriensis Thirumalai, 1994 i c g
 Rhagovelia nitida Bacon, 1948 i c g
 Rhagovelia novacaledonica Lundblad, 1936 i c g
 Rhagovelia novahispaniae D. Polhemus, 1997 i c g
 Rhagovelia novana Drake, 1953 i c g
 Rhagovelia oaxtepec D. Polhemus, 1997 i c g
 Rhagovelia obesa Uhler, 1871 i c g b
 Rhagovelia obi J. Polhemus and D. Polhemus, 1988 i c g
 Rhagovelia occulcata Drake, 1959 i c g
 Rhagovelia ochra Nieser, Zettel and Chen, 1997 i c g
 Rhagovelia ochroischion Nieser and D. Polhemus, 1999 i c g
 Rhagovelia oporapa Padilla-Gil, 2009 i c g
 Rhagovelia oriander Parshley, 1922 i c g
 Rhagovelia orientalis Lundblad, 1937 i c g
 Rhagovelia orientaloides Zettel, 1995 i c g
 Rhagovelia origami D. Polhemus and Andersen, 2010 i c g
 Rhagovelia ornata Bacon, 1948 i c g
 Rhagovelia pacayana Drake and Carvalho, 1955 i c g
 Rhagovelia pacifica Padilla-Gil, 2011 i c g
 Rhagovelia palawanensis Zettel, 1994 i c g
 Rhagovelia palea Bacon, 1956 i c g
 Rhagovelia pallida Lundblad, 1936 i c g
 Rhagovelia panamensis D. Polhemus, 1997 i c g
 Rhagovelia panayensis Zettel, 1995 i c g
 Rhagovelia panda Drake and Harris, 1935 i c g
 Rhagovelia papuensis Lundblad, 1936 i c g
 Rhagovelia paulana Drake, 1953 i c g
 Rhagovelia pediformis Padilla-Gil, 2010 i c g
 Rhagovelia peggiae Kirkaldy, 1901 i c g
 Rhagovelia penta  g
 Rhagovelia perfecta D. Polhemus, 1997 i c g
 Rhagovelia perija D. Polhemus, 1997 i c g
 Rhagovelia pexa Hoberlandt, 1941 i c g
 Rhagovelia philippina Lundblad, 1936 i c g
 Rhagovelia phoretica D. Polhemus, 1995 i c g
 Rhagovelia pidaxa J. Polhemus and Herring, 1970 i c g
 Rhagovelia plana Drake and Harris, 1933 i c g
 Rhagovelia planipes Gould, 1931 i c g
 Rhagovelia plaumanni D. Polhemus, 1997 i c g
 Rhagovelia plumbea Uhler, 1894 i c g b
 Rhagovelia plychona Nieser, Zettel and Chen, 1997 i c g
 Rhagovelia polhemi Y. C. Gupta and Khandelwal, 2004 i c g
 Rhagovelia polymorpha Zettel and Tran, 2004 i c g
 Rhagovelia potamophila Zettel, 1996 i c g
 Rhagovelia priori Lansbury, 1993 i c g
 Rhagovelia problematica Zettel, 2006 i c g
 Rhagovelia pruinosa J. Polhemus and D. Polhemus, 1988 i c g
 Rhagovelia pseudocelebensis Nieser and Chen, 1993 i c g
 Rhagovelia pseudotijuca Moreira and Barbosa, 2011 i c g
 Rhagovelia pulchra Gould, 1931 i c g
 Rhagovelia quilichaensis Padilla-Gil, 2011 i c g
 Rhagovelia raddai Zettel, 1994 i c g
 Rhagovelia rajana D. Polhemus and J. Polhemus, 2011 i c g
 Rhagovelia ramphus Padilla-Gil, 2009 i c g
 Rhagovelia ranau J. Polhemus and D. Polhemus, 1988 i c g
 Rhagovelia ravana Kirkaldy, 1902 i c g
 Rhagovelia raymondi Zettel, 1995 i c g
 Rhagovelia reclusa D. Polhemus, 1997 i c g
 Rhagovelia regalis Drake and Harris, 1927 i c g
 Rhagovelia reitteri Reuter, 1882 i c g
 Rhagovelia relicta Gould, 1931 i c g
 Rhagovelia reuteri Hoberlandt, 1951 i c g
 Rhagovelia ridicula D. Polhemus, 1995 i c g
 Rhagovelia rigovae Zettel, 2012 i c g
 Rhagovelia rioana Drake, 1953 i c g
 Rhagovelia ripithes D. Polhemus, 1997 i c g
 Rhagovelia rivale Torre-bueno, 1924 i c g b
 Rhagovelia rivulosa J. Polhemus and D. Polhemus, 1985 i c g
 Rhagovelia robina Nieser and Chen, 1993 i c g
 Rhagovelia robusta Gould, 1931 i c g
 Rhagovelia roldani D. Polhemus, 1997 i c g
 Rhagovelia rosarensis Padilla-Gil, 2010 i c g
 Rhagovelia rosensis Padilla-Gil, 2011 i c g
 Rhagovelia rubra D. Polhemus, 1997 i c g
 Rhagovelia rudischuhi Zettel, 1993 i c g
 Rhagovelia rufescens Zettel, 2012 i c g
 Rhagovelia sabela J. Polhemus and D. Polhemus, 1988 i c g
 Rhagovelia sabrina Drake, 1958 i c g
 Rhagovelia sahabe D. Polhemus and Andersen, 2015 i c g
 Rhagovelia salawati D. Polhemus and J. Polhemus, 2011 i c g
 Rhagovelia salina (Champion, 1898) i c g
 Rhagovelia sallyae Zettel, 2003 i c g
 Rhagovelia samardaca J. Polhemus and D. Polhemus, 1988 i c g
 Rhagovelia samarinda J. Polhemus and D. Polhemus, 1988 i c g
 Rhagovelia sandoka D. Polhemus and Andersen, 2015 i c g
 Rhagovelia santanderi  g
 Rhagovelia saotomae (Sallier Dupin, 1976) i c g
 Rhagovelia sarawakensis J. Polhemus and D. Polhemus, 1988 i c g
 Rhagovelia sbolos Nieser and D. Polhemus, 1999 i c g
 Rhagovelia scabra Bacon, 1956 i c g
 Rhagovelia schoedli Zettel, 1996 i c g
 Rhagovelia scitula Bacon, 1956 i c g
 Rhagovelia sculpturata D. Polhemus and Andersen, 2010 i c g
 Rhagovelia secluda Drake and Maldonado-Capriles, 1956 i c g
 Rhagovelia sehnali Buzzetti and Zettel, 2007 i c g
 Rhagovelia seychellensis Lundblad, 1936 i c g
 Rhagovelia seyferti Zettel, 1995 i c g
 Rhagovelia sibuyana Zettel, 1996 i c g
 Rhagovelia silau J. Polhemus and D. Polhemus, 1988 i c g
 Rhagovelia simulata J. Polhemus and D. Polhemus, 1988 i c g
 Rhagovelia singaporensis Yang and D. Polhemus, 1994 i c g
 Rhagovelia sinuata Gould, 1931 i c g
 Rhagovelia skoura Nieser, Zettel and Chen, 1997 i c g
 Rhagovelia solida Bacon, 1956 i c g
 Rhagovelia sondaica J. Polhemus and D. Polhemus, 1988 i c g
 Rhagovelia sooretama Moreira, Nessimian and Rúdio in Moreira et al., 2010 i c g
 Rhagovelia sorsogonensis Zettel, 2014 i c g
 Rhagovelia spinigera Champion, 1898 i c g
 Rhagovelia spinosa Gould, 1931 i c g
 Rhagovelia springerae Moreira, Pacheco-Chaves and Cordeiro in Moreira et al., 2015 i c g
 Rhagovelia starmuehlneri J. Polhemus, 1990 i c g
 Rhagovelia sterea Nieser, Zettel and Chen, 1997 i c g
 Rhagovelia stibea Drake, 1958 i c g
 Rhagovelia styx D. Polhemus and J. Polhemus, 2011 i c g
 Rhagovelia suarezensis D. Polhemus and Andersen, 2010 i c g
 Rhagovelia sulawesiana J. Polhemus and D. Polhemus, 1988 i c g
 Rhagovelia sumaldei Zettel, 2012 i c g
 Rhagovelia sumatrensis Lundblad, 1933 i c g
 Rhagovelia tablasensis Zettel, 1996 i c g
 Rhagovelia takona D. Polhemus and Andersen, 2015 i c g
 Rhagovelia tansiongcoi Zettel, 1995 i c g
 Rhagovelia tantilla Drake and Harris, 1933 i c g
 Rhagovelia tarahumara D. Polhemus, 1997 i c g
 Rhagovelia tawau J. Polhemus and D. Polhemus, 1988 i c g
 Rhagovelia tayloriella Kirkaldy, 1900 i c g
 Rhagovelia tebakang J. Polhemus and D. Polhemus, 1988 i c g
 Rhagovelia tenuipes Champion, 1898 i c g
 Rhagovelia teresa Moreira, Nessimian and Rúdio in Moreira et al., 2010 i c g
 Rhagovelia tesari Hoberlandt, 1941 i c g
 Rhagovelia thaumana Drake, 1958 i c g
 Rhagovelia thysanotos Lansbury, 1993 i c g
 Rhagovelia tibialis Lundblad, 1936 i c g
 Rhagovelia tijuca D. Polhemus, 1997 i c g
 Rhagovelia torquata Bacon, 1948 i c g
 Rhagovelia torreyana Bacon, 1956 i c g
 Rhagovelia tozeur Baena, Nieser and Gallardo, 1994 i c g
 Rhagovelia traili (Buchanan-White, 1879) i c g
 Rhagovelia transbintuni D. Polhemus and J. Polhemus, 2011 i c g
 Rhagovelia trepida Bacon, 1948 i c g
 Rhagovelia triangula Drake, 1953 i c g
 Rhagovelia trianguloides Nieser and D. Polhemus, 1999 i c g
 Rhagovelia trichota Nieser and Chen, 1993 i c g
 Rhagovelia tricoma  g
 Rhagovelia trista Gould, 1931 i c g
 Rhagovelia tropidata Nieser and Chen, 1993 i c g
 Rhagovelia tsaratananae Poisson, 1952 i c g
 Rhagovelia tsecuri Padilla-Gil, 2009 i c g
 Rhagovelia tsouloufi Nieser, Zettel and Chen, 1997 i c g
 Rhagovelia tumaquensis  g
 Rhagovelia turmalis Nieser and D. Polhemus, 1999 i c g
 Rhagovelia ullrichi Zettel, 2001 i c g
 Rhagovelia umbria  g
 Rhagovelia uncinata Champion, 1898 i c g
 Rhagovelia unica J. Polhemus and D. Polhemus, 1988 i c g
 Rhagovelia usingeri Hungerford and Matsuda, 1961 i c g
 Rhagovelia vaniniae Moreira, Nessimian and Rúdio in Moreira et al., 2010 i c g
 Rhagovelia varipes Champion, 1898 i c g
 Rhagovelia vega Padilla-Gil, 2011 i c g
 Rhagovelia vegana Drake and Maldonado-Capriles, 1956 i c g
 Rhagovelia velocis Drake and Harris, 1935 i c g
 Rhagovelia venezuelana D. Polhemus, 1997 i c g
 Rhagovelia versuta Drake and Harris, 1935 i c g
 Rhagovelia victoria Padilla-Gil, 2012 i c g
 Rhagovelia viriosa Bacon, 1956 i c g
 Rhagovelia vivata Bacon, 1948 i c g
 Rhagovelia vonprahli Manzano, Nieser and Caicedo, 1995 i c g
 Rhagovelia wallacei J. Polhemus and D. Polhemus, 1988 i c g
 Rhagovelia wenzeli D. Polhemus and Andersen, 2015 i c g
 Rhagovelia werneri Hungerford and Matsuda, 1961 i c g
 Rhagovelia whitei (Breddin, 1898) i c g
 Rhagovelia williamsi Gould, 1931 i c g
 Rhagovelia yacuivana Drake, 1958 i c g
 Rhagovelia yangae Zettel and Tran, 2004 i c g
 Rhagovelia yanomamo D. Polhemus, 1997 i c g
 Rhagovelia zecai Moreira and Barbosa, 2014 i c g
 Rhagovelia zela Drake, 1959 i c g
 Rhagovelia zeteki Drake, 1953 i c g

Data sources: i = ITIS, c = Catalogue of Life, g = GBIF, b = Bugguide.net

References

Rhagovelia